Heinrich Wallner (born 24 February 1941) is an Austrian cross-country skier. He competed at the 1968 Winter Olympics, the 1972 Winter Olympics and the 1976 Winter Olympics.

References

1941 births
Living people
Austrian male cross-country skiers
Olympic cross-country skiers of Austria
Cross-country skiers at the 1968 Winter Olympics
Cross-country skiers at the 1972 Winter Olympics
Cross-country skiers at the 1976 Winter Olympics
People from Kitzbühel District
Sportspeople from Tyrol (state)
20th-century Austrian people